Trabecula jeffreysiana is a species of very small sea snail, a marine gastropod mollusk in the family Pyramidellidae, the pyrams and their allies.

Taxonomy
This species has been generally cited in the combinations Chrysallida jeffreysiana or Odostomella jeffreysiana but must be restored to its original combination since Trabecula is currently treated as a valid genus.

Distribution
This marine species occurs in the Mediterranean Sea and in the Atlantic Ocean off Madeira, the Canary Islands and Mauritania.

References

 Monterosato T. A. (di) (1884). Nomenclatura generica e specifica di alcune conchiglie mediterranee. Palermo, Virzi, 152 pp.
 van der Linden J. & Eikenboom J.C.A. (1992) On the taxonomy of the Recent species of the genus Chrysallida Carpenter from Europe, the Canary Islands and the Azores. Basteria 56: 3-63.
 Rolán E., 2005. Malacological Fauna From The Cape Verde Archipelago. Part 1, Polyplacophora and Gastropoda.

External links
 To CLEMAM
 To Encyclopedia of Life

Pyramidellidae
Molluscs of the Atlantic Ocean
Molluscs of the Mediterranean Sea
Invertebrates of West Africa
Gastropods described in 1884